Thomas Robinson, 1st Baron Grantham,  (c. 169530 September 1770), of Newby, Yorkshire, was a British diplomat and politician who sat in the House of Commons between 1727 and 1761.

Early life
Robinson was a younger son of Sir William Robinson, Bt (1655–1736) of Newby-on-Swale, Yorkshire, who was Member of Parliament for York from 1697 to 1722. His elder brother was Rear Admiral Sir Tancred Robinson. He had been a scholar and minor fellow of Trinity College, Cambridge.

Career
Robinson gained his earliest diplomatic experience in Paris. At the 1727 British general election he was returned as Member of Parliament for Thirsk on the Frankland interest, after his eldest brother, for whom the seat had originally been intended, resigned his pretensions to him. He was absent, presumably on account of his diplomatic duties, from all the recorded divisions of that Parliament. After Paris he went to Vienna, where he was English ambassador from 1730 to 1748. During 1741 he sought to make peace between the empress Maria Theresa and Frederick the Great, but in vain, and in 1748 he represented his country at the Congress of Aix-la-Chapelle. He was made a Knight Companion of the Bath in 1742.

Returning to England Robinson sat in parliament for Christchurch from 1749 to 1761. In 1750, he was appointed to the Privy Council.

Southern Secretary

In 1754 Robinson was appointed Secretary of State for the Southern Department and Leader of the House of Commons by the prime minister, the Duke of Newcastle, and it was on this occasion that Pitt made the famous remark to Fox, "the duke might as well have sent us his jackboot to lead us." In November 1755 he resigned, and in April 1761 he was created Baron Grantham.

Later career
He was Master of the Great Wardrobe 1749–1754 and again 1755–1760, and was joint Postmaster-General in 1765 and 1766. He died in London on 30 September 1770.

He married Frances, daughter of Thomas Worsley of Hovingham, on 13 July 1737, and had two sons and six daughters. He was succeeded in the peerage by his eldest son Thomas.

The town of Grantham, New Hampshire in the United States of America is named after Robinson.

References

External links

1695 births
1770 deaths
Barons in the Peerage of Great Britain
Peers of Great Britain created by George III
British MPs 1727–1734
British MPs 1747–1754
British MPs 1754–1761
British Secretaries of State
Knights Companion of the Order of the Bath
Robinson, Thomas
Members of the Privy Council of Great Britain
Robinson, Thomas
Leaders of the House of Commons of Great Britain
Alumni of Trinity College, Cambridge
Fellows of Trinity College, Cambridge
Ambassadors of Great Britain to Poland
People from Grantham
United Kingdom Postmasters General
Thomas
Ambassadors of Great Britain to the Holy Roman Emperor